Fudbalski klub Drina Zvornik (Serbian Cyrillic: Фудбалски клуб Дрина Зворник) is a professional association football club from the city of Zvornik that is situated Bosnia and Herzegovina.

The club competes in the First League of the Republika Srpska and plays its home matches on the Gradski Stadion (City Stadium) in Zvornik, which has a capacity of 3,000 seats.

History

Football first begin being played in Zvornik soon after World War I. The first football match was played in 1924 between a team from Zvornik against visitors from Srebrenica. The first football club was formed in 1933 and named Zmaj od Noćaja. It represented the Serb community of the town. A year later Bosniak club named Sloga was formed so the city of Zvornik had two football clubs in the period between the two world wars. Just before the start of the Second World War the two clubs are dismembered and a new club named Omladinac is formed.

Just after the end of the war a new club, FK Drina was formed. The first club president was Mr. Nikola Mastilica. The first match recorded by the press and probably the first match in competition was played on May 17, 1946, in Tuzla against FK Sloboda Tuzla. During the period within SFR Yugoslavia the club played mostly in lower national leagues.

During the 1990s, another team from Živinice also represented Drina Zvornik, but played at Bosniaks Football League. With the break-up of Yugoslavia, in 1992, the Football Association of Republika Srpska is formed. Drina Zvornik was a member of the first league season in 1995–96 to be organised by the FAoRS. The league was divided into two groups and the club played in the First League – East. In this first season the club ended up relegated but after only one season the club as champion of the Second League – group Bijeljina was promoted and played in the First League in the season 1997–98. The club suffered relegation once more but would return to the First League in the season 2002–03, this time staying in the league all the way until 2010. In the session 2009–10, the club was the league champion, and now being the First League of Republika Srpska part of the Bosnia and Herzegovina league system, the club achieved its greatest result ever and earned a promotion to the Premier League of Bosnia and Herzegovina. But it was relegated again to the lower tier, after finishing last in its first season (2010–11) after promotion to the Premier League.

In 2013–14 Drina Zvornik finished first in the First League of Republika Srpska and was again promoted to the Premier League.

Club seasons

Honours

Domestic

League
First League of the Republika Srpska:
Winners (2): 2009–10, 2013–14

Players

Current squad

Notable players
''For the list of former and current players with Wikipedia article, please see :Category:FK Drina Zvornik players.

Coaching staff

Club management

Historical list of coaches

 Darko Nestorović (2002–2003)
 Miroslav Milanović (2003–2004)
 Mladen Milinković (2004–2006)
 Mile Lazarević (2006–2007)
 Mladen Milinković (2007–2009)
 Milan Gutović (2009)
 Miodrag Radović (2010)
 Miroslav Milanović (Jul 2010 - Sep 2010)
 Darko Vojvodić (September 20, 2010 – March 13, 2011)
 Milenko Milošević & Svetozar Vukašinović (2011)
 Dragan Mićić (March 25, 2011 – March 22, 2015)
 Vladica Petrović (July 8, 2015 – October 2, 2015)
 Cvijetin Blagojević (February 21, 2016 – May 17, 2016)
 Mile Lazarević (June 1, 2016 – June 14, 2017)
 Veljko Cvijetinović (Jul 2017 – Sep 2018)
 Milenko Bošnjaković (December 13, 2018 – March 17, 2019)
 Aleksandar Vasić (March 26, 2019 – June 30, 2019)
 Miroslav Milanović (Nov 2019 - Oct 2020)
 Bratislav Tešić (Aug 2020 - )

References

External sources
Official site 
Blog about the club.

 
Football clubs in Republika Srpska
Football clubs in Bosnia and Herzegovina
Zvornik
1945 establishments in Bosnia and Herzegovina